Live at the Greek Theatre is the fourteenth live album by American blues rock musician Joe Bonamassa. The album was recorded on August 29, 2015 at the Greek Theatre in Los Angeles and released by J&R Adventures on Blu-ray, DVD and CD on September 23, 2016.

This album is a tribute to the "three Kings" : Freddie King (songs 1 to 6 of CD 1 and 8 of CD 2), Albert King (songs 7 to 11 of CD 1 and 1 and 9 of CD 2) and especially BB King (Songs 1 to 7 and 10 and 11 of CD 2), who was a mentor for young Bonamassa.

The Live at the Greek Theater album art was done by rock artist Jim Evans a.k.a. TAZ, who collaborated with Producer Kevin Shirley. It peaked at number one on the Billboard Top Blues Albums.

Track listing
Disc one

Disc two

Personnel

Musicians
 Joe Bonamassa – guitar, vocals
 Anton Fig – percussion
 Reese Wynans – keyboards
 Michael Rhodes – bass
 Kirk Fletcher – guitar
 Lee Thornburg – Trumpet 
 Paulie Cerra & Ron Dziubla – saxophone 
 Mahalia Barnes, Jade MacRae & Juanita Tippins – background vocals

Critical reception

While Christopher Bohlsen praised the performance in Live at the Greek Theatre, Bohlsen noted that the two hour duration of the album would not please everyone. Similarly, Mark Deming of AllMusic said Joe Bonamassa showcased what he learnt from his musical influences.

Chart performance

References

Albums produced by Kevin Shirley
Joe Bonamassa albums
2016 live albums
Albums recorded at the Greek Theatre (Los Angeles)